Saint Thomas More Academy is a private, Roman Catholic school in Burton, Michigan. It is located in the Roman Catholic Diocese of Lansing.

Background
St. Thomas More Academy was established in 1989.

References

External links
 School website

Roman Catholic Diocese of Lansing
Catholic secondary schools in Michigan
Educational institutions established in 1989
Schools in Genesee County, Michigan
1989 establishments in Michigan